Priyadarshan (born 30 January 1957) is an Indian film director and screenwriter who predominantly works in Malayalam and Hindi cinema. He was one of the first directors in India to introduce rich color grading, clear sound and quality dubbing through his early Malayalam films.

Priyadarshan began his career in Malayalam cinema in the early 1980s and was active throughout the 1980s and 1990s. Towards 2000s, he moved to Bollywood (Hindi-language cinema) and remained active throughout the decade. In 2013, he announced that Rangrezz would be his last Hindi film for a while and shifted focus to Malayalam cinema. His most notable films include Mazha Peyyunnu Maddalam Kottunnu, Thalavattam, Vellanakalude Nadu, Chithram, Vandanam, Kilukkam, Abhimanyu, Mithunam, Thenmavin Kombath, Kala Pani, and Chandralekha. 

He is known for adapting Malayalam films into Hindi, from his own work as well as from other films. Most notable such Bollywood films include Hera Pheri, Hungama, Hulchul, Garam Masala, Bhagam Bhag, Chup Chup Ke, De Dana Dan and Bhool Bhulaiyaa.

Early life 
Priyadarshan received his early education at Government Model School, Trivandrum and obtained a Master of Arts in Philosophy from University College Trivandrum. His father was a college librarian, it helped Priyadarshan to develop interest in books. He was a voracious reader during his teenage years, and during his study in college he started writing short plays and skits for All India Radio. He was influenced by the films of director P. Venu. His friends in those days included Mohanlal, M. G. Sreekumar, Suresh Kumar, Sanal Kumar, Jagadish, Maniyanpilla Raju and Ashok Kumar. It was then that Mohanlal entered in films. His friends followed him to Chennai, looking for a chance in films. Priyadarshan, with the help of Mohanlal, got a few chances to work as an assistant scriptwriter in a couple of films and started writing scripts, with some turning into success. Eventually, he had to come back to Kerala.

Film career 

Priyadarshan has been working since 40 years in Indian cinema as a director and screenwriter. He has directed over 95 Films in 4 Indian languages mainly, Malayalam, Tamil, Hindi and Telugu.

1984-1987 
In 1984, Priyadarshan, along with his close friends Suresh Kumar and Sanal Kumar, decided to produce a film as Shankar, the saleable hero, helped them in arranging finance from Thiruvenkadam, a top film financier. Mohanlal, who was by then a popular star, was selected as the parallel hero along with Shankar. Thus in 1984, Priyadarshan made his debut as director with Poochakkoru Mookkuthi, which was a surprise hit. A slapstick comedy film shot on a low budget, it completed a successful run of 100 days in Kerala theatres. Priyan continued his fine form for slapstick comedy with the successful Odaruthammava Aalariyam and he later made Onnanam Kunnil Oradi Kunnil and the Mammootty-Shankar family thriller Parayanumvayya Parayathirikkanumvayya. Then he made Punnaram Cholli Cholli, his first film without Mohanlal. His successful stinct continued with Boeing Boeing and Aram + Aram = Kinnaram, both doing wonderful business. He was later criticised for making Rakkuyilin Ragasadassil, a film which was supposed to be made with Shankar and Menaka and many said the lead pair Mammootty & Suhasini was miscast and in spite of hit songs, the film flopped. But Mazha Peyyunnu Maddalam Kottunnu, Ayalvasi Oru Daridravasi and Dheem Tharikida Thom became hits underlining his consistency. Priyan was accepted as a serious director with the highly successful tragic family drama Thalavattam. His Tamil film Chinnamanikkuyile remained unreleased, while his success stint continued in Malayalam with Cheppu being a success.

1988-1998 
1988 was a landmark year in Priyadarshan's career. He directed Vellanakalude Nadu, based on a script by Sreenivasan, with Mohanlal in the lead role. This film revolved around corruption, land mafia and other social issues. This film ended up becoming the biggest hit in Priyadarshan's career to that point. Then came Aryan, an action film based on the Mumbai underworld scripted by T.Damodaran, which completed 150 days in theatres. Chithram, Priyadarshan's all-time biggest hit, was also released in 1988. Chithram completed 366 days in theatres and created new records in collections, until they were broken by his own film, Kilukkam in 1991. Oru Muthassi Katha and Mukunthetta Sumitra Vilikkunnu completed his 5 releases of 1988. However, he couldn't deliver hits in 1990 with Kadathanadan Ambadi and Akkare Akkare Akkare. In the year 1991, Priyadarshan brought out Kilukkam with Mohanlal, Jagathi Sreekumar and Revathi . Kilukkam broke several collection records and is still considered one of the best films from the Priyadarshan-Mohanlal team. His next three films, Abhimanyu (1991), Advaitham (1992), and Thenmavin Kombathu (1994) successfully completed 100 days in theatres. Both Midhunam (1993) and Minnaram (1994) were able to make good response in cinemas. Meanwhile, Priyadarshan was invited by Shri. M. Karunanidhi to direct a film for his son's production house. Priyadarshan thus made his Tamil debut with Gopura Vasalile . In 1991 he also made a Telugu film Nirnayam when Nagarjuna approached him to remake his Malayalam film Vandanam in Telugu. In the year 1992, Priyadarshan made his debut in Bollywood with Muskurahat, again remake of his own Malayalam film Kilukkam which ended up as a disastrous flop.

In 1993, he made a comeback in Hindi with Gardish, an adaptation of the Malayalam film Kireedom, written by A. K. Lohithadas. Priyadarshan successfully added ingredients required for Hindi audiences and the film was a huge hit, opening the doors of Bollywood to him. In 1994, Priyadarshan directed his second and last Telugu film till date, Gandeevam, starring Balakrishna. He was also assigned the direction of the Miss World 1996 event that was held in Bangalore, which made him a known face around the country. In 1996, Priyadarshan came up with his dream project, Kalapani, an epic period film based on Indian struggle for Independence scripted by T.Damodaran. With Mohanlal, Tabu, Prabhu and Amrish Puri in main roles and outstanding music by Ilaiyaraja, Kalapani took Priyadarshan's career path to new heights. This film, which was originally filmed in Malayalam, was also dubbed and released in Tamil, Telugu, and Hindi simultaneously. Kalapani brought him several awards for the first time in his career. In 1997, Priyadarshan directed two films, Chandralekha in Malayalam and Virasat a Hindi adaptation of Bharathan's Tamil film Thevar Magan, both super hits. The success of Virasat made Priyadarshan a household name in Hindi cinema.
In the year 1998, Priyadarshan directed three films, Saat Rang Ke Sapne, remake of his own Thenmavin Kombathu, then Doli Saja Ke Rakhna, with story adapted from Fazils Aniyathi Pravu and Kabhi na Kabhi, but all three bombed at the box office. Priyadarshan joined with Mammooty after a long gap in 1999 for Megham. During this period Priyadarshan received a couple of offers from Chiranjeevi and Nagarjuna, actors of Telugu industry to direct them, but declined them and moved on to his next Hindi project.

2000-2016 
In 2000, Hera Pheri was released in Hindi, which for once and all changed the destiny of Priyadarshan in Bollywood. Hera Pheri, an adaptation of the Malayalam film Ramjirao Speaking (1989), was a huge hit at the box office. Starring Akshay Kumar, Sunil Shetty, Tabu and Paresh Rawal, this film is now considered a landmark in the history of Hindi cinema. The film also gave birth to the Priyadarshan-Akshay Kumar team, which in later years produced several hits. After Hera Pheri, Paresh Rawal became another regular face in Priyadarshan films. This film was followed by a series of films in Hindi including Yeh Teraa Ghar Yeh Meraa Ghar, Hungama, Hulchul, Garam Masala, and Kyon Ki. In the year 2000, Priyadarshan directed the Malayalam-Tamil bilingual Raakilipattu (Snegithiye in Tamil) starring Tabu and Jyothika, with story adapted from the Marathi film Bindhaast, an experimental film with all female characters, which was critically well received. The original plan was to release both versions simultaneously, but due to unknown reasons the Malayalam version was delayed and the Tamil version released first. The Malayalam as well as the dubbed Hindi version, Friendship, released only seven years later in 2007.

Priyadarshan's English language epic period film titled The Last Revolutionary produced by 20th Century Fox, based on the life of Indian freedom fighter Chandrasekhar Azad was supposed begin filming in 2001, but the project was shelved due to unknown reasons. During this period, Tamil actor Kamal Haasan was working on his ambitious film, Anbe Sivam. After finishing the script, Kamal Haasan approached Priyadarshan to direct the film. The pre-production commenced; but after some differences of opinion between the director and the actor; Priyadarshan opted out from the project before the first schedule. This sudden setback led to the whole crew to run out of their schedules. Hence, the producers after convincing Kamal Haasan, quickly roped in Sundar.C to direct the film.

Priyadarshan made the comedy film Kakkakuyil in 2001, bringing back the old combo of Mohanlal and Mukesh, which was popular in the 1980s and 1990s. The film was a superhit at the box office. Then his two other films in Malayalam, Kilichundan Mampazham and Vettam released in 2003 and 2004 respectively, were average run at box office, which made him concentrate more in Bollywood. But at the same time, in Hindi, Priyadarshan continued his successful run with Chup Chup Ke, Bhagam Bhag, Malamaal Weekly, Dhol, Bhool Bhulaiyaa, De Dana Dan and Mere Baap Pehle Aap. But his subsequent films Billu, Bumm Bumm Bole, Khatta Meeta, Aakrosh and Tezz failed to live up to the expectations. His most recent release Rangrezz also failed at the box-office.
In the meantime, Priyadarshan stunned everyone with Kanchivaram, an offbeat film that revolved around the weavers in Kanchipuram. Prakash Raj, who played the central character, won the National Film Award for Best Actor in 2008. Kanchivaram also won accolades at several film festivals.

Priyadarshan returned to Malayalam films directing the Mohanlal starrer, Arabeem Ottakom P. Madhavan Nayarum in Oru Marubhoomikkadha. The 2013 film Geethaanjali starring Mohanlal as Dr. Sunny Joseph, and the 2014 film Aamayum Muyalum did not do well at the box-office.

In late 2015, Priyadarshan announced a crime thriller film in Malayalam, with Mohanlal in the lead role. The production was confirmed and the title Oppam was announced in December 2015. The director started working on the film ahead of another big-budget film starring Mohanlal, which was delayed due to unfavourable weather in Russia, where the film was supposed to be shot. The screenplay and dialogues are written by Priyadarshan himself which is based on the story by debutant writer Govind Vijayan. The film released to positive reviews and emerged as a blockbuster, beating several records and becoming the highest grossing Malayalam film of the year within 16 days of release.

2018-present 
In early 2018, he started pre-production on Marakkar: Arabikadalinte Simham, a Malayalam language epic historical period film set in the 16th century. The film with Mohanlal in the titular role, is based on the battle exploits of Kunjali Marakkar IV—the naval chieftain of the Zamorin of Calicut. Kunjali Marakkars organised the first naval defense of the Indian coast by safeguarding Calicut from Portuguese invasion for almost a century. The film was eventually released on 2 December 2021.

Other work
Priyadarshan has also directed many advertisement films. His most popular commercials are for Coca-Cola, American Express, Nokia, Parker Pens, Asian Paints, Kinley and Max New York Life Insurance.

Frequent collaborators 
He frequently collaborated with actors like Mohanlal, Mammootty, Shankar, Kuthiravattam Pappu, Thikkurissy Sukumaran Nair, Sankaradi, M.G. Soman, Thilakan, Jagathy Sreekumar, Innocent, Nedumudi Venu, Sreenivasan, Sukumari, Kaviyoor Ponnamma, Shobana, KPAC Lalitha, Revathi, Lissy, Cochin Haneefa, Maniyanpilla Raju, Mukesh, Nandhu, Jagadeesh, C.I. Paul, Vineeth, Ganesh Kumar and Mamukoya.

His multiple collaborations in Hindi include Tabu, Paresh Rawal, Pooja Batra, Amrish Puri, Johny Lever, Asrani, Akshay Kumar, Anil Kapoor, Akshaye Khanna, Kareena Kapoor, Om Puri, Tinnu Anand, Shakti Kapoor, Rajpal Yadav, Manoj Joshi, Sharat Saxena, Arbaaz Khan, Jackie Shroff and Suniel Shetty.

Personal life
He married actress Lissy on 13 December 1990. The couple got divorced in 2016,
actress Kalyani and Sidharth are their children.

Filmography

Awards and honours
Priyadarshan has won awards, given by the State and Central government for his movies. His offbeat film Kanchivaram was adjudged the best feature film at the 2007 National Film Awards. He made a period epic film titled Kaalapani, in Malayalam, which told the story of freedom fighters in the jail at Andaman and Nicobar Islands; it starred Mohanlal, Tabu, Prabhu and Amrish Puri, and received four National Film Awards, including awards for Santosh Sivan (cinematography) and Sabu Cyril (art direction). The film was dubbed and released in other languages such as Tamil, Telugu and Hindi.

Civilian Awards
 2012 – Padma Shri Awarded "Padma Shri", by the president of India for his contribution to Indian Cinema.

National Film Awards
 2007 – Director of the Best Feature Film – Kanchivaram (Golden Lotus)
 2007 – Producer of the Best Feature Film – Kanchivaram (Golden Lotus)
 2019 – Director of the Best Feature Film – Marakkar: Lion of the Arabian Sea (Golden Lotus)

Kerala State Film Awards
 1994 – Kerala State Film Award for Best Film with Popular Appeal and Aesthetic Value – Thenmavin Kombath
 1995 – Kerala State Film Award for Second Best Film – Kaalapani

Kerala Film Critics Association Awards
 1991 – Kerala Film Critics Association Award for Best Popular Film – Kilukkam
 2016 – Kerala Film Critics Association Award for Best Film – Oppam
 2016 – Kerala Film Critics Association Award for Best Director – Oppam

Filmfare Awards South
 2009 – Filmfare Award for Best Director – Tamil – Kanchivaram

FilmFare Awards
 1997 – Filmfare Award for Best Film (Critics) – Virasat

Other Awards 
 2008 – Special Honour Jury Award for Outstanding contributions to Indian Cinema
 2008 – Special Jury Award at Chennai & Jaipur International Film Festival – 'Sila Samayangalil', an art movie on AIDS awareness.
 2010 – Jaihind Rajat Mudra Award
 2016 – Asiavision Award for Best Director – Oppam
 2019 – Kishore Kumar Award by the Government of Madhya Pradesh
 2022 – Honorary doctorate (D.Litt) from Hindustan Institute of Technology and Science.
 'Excellence Award', by Hindustan University, Chennai – 2013
 Kerala Government's Appointment under Ministry of Culture:
 Chairman of Kerala State Chalachithra Academy for the period 2011-2014 
 Director of International Film Festival of Kerala for the period 2011–2014.

 Sports 

 Columnist for Malayala Manorama Newspaper for international cricket matches played in Kerala.
 Chairperson of the Committee of Ceremonies for the 35th National Games held in Kerala in 2015.

Social 

 Rising Star Outreach of India – Served as Director from July 2014 till March 2019; Rising star is one of the largest leprosy eradication organization in the world, running welfare centres and educational institutions for leprosy affected people and their family.

Government of India's appointment under Ministry of Information & Broadcasting :
Priyadarshan served as 'Chairperson', of the Feature Films Jury of the 50th International Film Festival of India (IFFI) 2019.
He was the Central Jury Chairperson of 64th National Awards for 2016 (President's Award for the Year 2016 )

References

External links

 Official website
 
 
Exclusive biography of #Priyadarshan and on his life.

Film directors from Thiruvananthapuram
Malayalam film directors
Film producers from Thiruvananthapuram
Hindi-language film directors
Kerala State Film Award winners
Living people
1957 births
Filmfare Awards South winners
Recipients of the Padma Shri in arts
20th-century Indian film directors
21st-century Indian film directors
Malayalam screenwriters
People from Thiruvananthapuram
20th-century Indian dramatists and playwrights
Screenwriters from Thiruvananthapuram
Directors who won the Best Feature Film National Film Award